Susan Sontag (January 16, 1933 – December 28, 2004) was an American writer, philosopher, and political activist. She mostly wrote essays, but also published novels; she published her first major work, the essay "Notes on 'Camp'", in 1964. Her best-known works include the critical works Against Interpretation (1966), Styles of Radical Will (1968), On Photography (1977), and Illness as Metaphor (1978), as well as the fictional works The Way We Live Now (1986), The Volcano Lover (1992), and In America (1999).

Sontag was active in writing and speaking about, or travelling to, areas of conflict, including during the Vietnam War and the Siege of Sarajevo. She wrote extensively about photography, culture and media, AIDS and illness, human rights, and leftist ideology. Her essays and speeches drew controversy, and she has been described as "one of the most influential critics of her generation".

Early life and education
Sontag was born Susan Rosenblatt in New York City, the daughter of Mildred (née Jacobson) and Jack Rosenblatt, both Jews of Lithuanian and Polish descent. Her father managed a fur trading business in China, where he died of tuberculosis in 1939, when Susan was five years old. Seven years later, Sontag's mother married US Army Captain Nathan Sontag. Susan and her sister, Judith, took their stepfather's surname, although he did not adopt them formally. Sontag did not have a religious upbringing and said she had not entered a synagogue until her mid-20s.

Remembering an unhappy childhood, with a cold, distant mother who was "always away", Sontag lived on Long Island, New York, then in Tucson, Arizona, and later in the San Fernando Valley in southern California, where she took refuge in books and graduated from North Hollywood High School at the age of 15. She began her undergraduate studies at the University of California, Berkeley but transferred to the University of Chicago in admiration of its prominent core curriculum. At Chicago, she undertook studies in philosophy, ancient history, and literature alongside her other requirements. Leo Strauss, Joseph Schwab, Christian Mackauer, Richard McKeon, Peter von Blanckenhagen, and Kenneth Burke were among her lecturers. She graduated at the age of 18 with an A.B. and was elected to Phi Beta Kappa. While at Chicago, she became best friends with fellow student Mike Nichols. In 1951, her work appeared in print for the first time in the winter issue of the Chicago Review.

At 17, Sontag married writer Philip Rieff, who was a sociology instructor at the University of Chicago, after a 10-day courtship; their marriage lasted eight years. While studying at Chicago, Sontag attended a summer school taught by the sociologist  who became a friend and subsequently influenced her study of German thinkers. Upon completing her Chicago degree, Sontag taught freshman English at the University of Connecticut for the 1952–53 academic year. She attended Harvard University for graduate school, initially studying literature with Perry Miller and Harry Levin before moving into philosophy and theology under Paul Tillich, Jacob Taubes, Raphael Demos, and Morton White.

After completing her Master of Arts in philosophy, she began doctoral research into metaphysics, ethics, Greek philosophy and Continental philosophy and theology at Harvard. The philosopher Herbert Marcuse lived with Sontag and Rieff for a year while working on his 1955 book Eros and Civilization. Sontag researched for Rieff's 1959 study Freud: The Mind of the Moralist before their divorce in 1958, and contributed to the book to such an extent that she has been considered an unofficial co-author. The couple had a son, David Rieff, who went on to be his mother's editor at Farrar, Straus and Giroux, as well as a writer in his own right.

Sontag was awarded an American Association of University Women's fellowship for the 1957–1958 academic year to St Anne's College, Oxford, where she traveled without her husband and son. There, she had classes with Iris Murdoch, Stuart Hampshire, A. J. Ayer, and H. L. A. Hart while also attending the B. Phil seminars of J. L. Austin and the lectures of Isaiah Berlin. Oxford did not appeal to her, however, and she transferred after Michaelmas term of 1957 to the University of Paris (the Sorbonne). In Paris, Sontag socialized with expatriate artists and academics including Allan Bloom, Jean Wahl, Alfred Chester, Harriet Sohmers, and María Irene Fornés. Sontag remarked that her time in Paris was, perhaps, the most important period of her life. It certainly provided the basis of her long intellectual and artistic association with the culture of France. She moved to New York in 1959 to live with Fornés for the next seven years, regaining custody of her son and teaching at universities while her literary reputation grew.

Career

Fiction

While working on her stories, Sontag taught philosophy at Sarah Lawrence College and City University of New York and the Philosophy of Religion with Jacob Taubes, Susan Taubes, Theodor Gaster, and Hans Jonas, in the Religion Department at Columbia University from 1960 to 1964. She held a writing fellowship at Rutgers University for 1964 to 1965 before ending her relationship with academia in favor of full-time freelance writing.

At age 30, she published an experimental novel called The Benefactor (1963), following it four years later with Death Kit (1967). Despite a relatively small output, Sontag thought of herself principally as a novelist and writer of fiction. Her short story "The Way We Live Now" was published to great acclaim on November 24, 1986 in The New Yorker. Written in an experimental narrative style, it remains a significant text on the AIDS epidemic. She achieved late popular success as a best-selling novelist with The Volcano Lover (1992). At age 67, Sontag published her final novel In America (2000). The last two novels were set in the past, which Sontag said gave her greater freedom to write in the polyphonic voice:

She wrote and directed four films and also wrote several plays, the most successful of which were Alice in Bed and Lady from the Sea.

Nonfiction
It was through her essays that Sontag gained early fame and notoriety. Sontag wrote frequently about the intersection of high and low art and expanded the dichotomy concept of form and art in every medium. She elevated camp to the status of recognition with her widely read 1964 essay "Notes on 'Camp'", which accepted art as including common, absurd and burlesque themes.

In 1977, Sontag published the series of essays On Photography. These essays are an exploration of photographs as a collection of the world, mainly by travelers or tourists, and the way we experience it. In the essays, she outlined her theory of taking pictures as you travel:
The method especially appeals to people handicapped by a ruthless work ethic—Germans, Japanese and Americans. Using a camera appeases the anxiety which the work driven feel about not working when they are on vacation and supposed to be having fun. They have something to do that is like a friendly imitation of work: they can take pictures. (p. 10)

Sontag writes that the convenience of modern photography has created an overabundance of visual material, and "just about everything has been photographed". This has altered our expectations of what we have the right to view, want to view or should view. "In teaching us a new visual code, photographs alter and enlarge our notion of what is worth looking at and what we have the right to observe" and has changed our "viewing ethics". Photographs have increased our access to knowledge and experiences of history and faraway places, but the images may replace direct experience and limit reality. She also states that photography desensitizes its audience to horrific human experiences, and children are exposed to experiences before they are ready for them.

Sontag continued to theorize about the role of photography in real life in her essay "Looking at War: Photography's View of Devastation and Death", which appeared in the December 9, 2002 issue of The New Yorker. There she concludes that the problem of our reliance on images and especially photographic images is not that "people remember through photographs but that they remember only the photographs ... that the photographic image eclipses other forms of understanding—and remembering. ... To remember is, more and more, not to recall a story but to be able to call up a picture" (p. 94).

She became a role-model for many feminists and aspiring female writers during the 1960s and 1970s.

Activism
Sontag became politically active in the 1960s, opposing the Vietnam War. In January 1968, she signed the "Writers and Editors War Tax Protest" pledge, vowing to refuse to pay a proposed 10% Vietnam War surtax. In May 1968, she visited Hanoi; afterwards, she wrote positively about North Vietnamese society in her essay Trip to Hanoi.

During 1989 Sontag was the President of PEN American Center, the main U.S. branch of the International PEN writers' organization. After Iranian leader Ayatollah Khomeini issued a fatwa death sentence against writer Salman Rushdie for blasphemy after the publication of his novel The Satanic Verses that year, Sontag's uncompromising support of Rushdie was crucial in rallying American writers to his cause.

A few years later, during the Siege of Sarajevo, Sontag gained attention for directing a production of Samuel Beckett's Waiting for Godot in a candlelit theater in the Bosnian capital, cut off from its electricity supply for three and a half years. The reaction of Sarajevo's besieged residents was noted:To the people of Sarajevo, Ms. Sontag has become a symbol, interviewed frequently by the local newspapers and television, invited to speak at gatherings everywhere, asked for autographs on the street. After the opening performance of the play, the city's Mayor, Muhamed Kreševljaković, came onstage to declare her an honorary citizen, the only foreigner other than the recently departed United Nations commander, Lieut. Gen. Phillippe Morillon, to be so named.

"It is for your bravery, in coming here, living here, and working with us," he said.

Personal life
Sontag's mother died of lung cancer in Hawaii in 1986.

Sontag died in New York City on December 28, 2004, aged 71, from complications of myelodysplastic syndrome which had evolved into acute myelogenous leukemia. She is buried in Paris at Cimetière du Montparnasse. Her final illness has been chronicled by her son, David Rieff.

Sexuality and relationships

Sontag became aware of her bisexuality during her early teens. At 15, she wrote in her diary, "I feel I have lesbian tendencies (how reluctantly I write this)." At 16, she had a sexual encounter with a woman: "Perhaps I was drunk, after all, because it was so beautiful when H began making love to me... It had been 4:00 before we had gotten to bed... I became fully conscious that I desired her, she knew it, too."

Sontag lived with 'H', the writer and model Harriet Sohmers Zwerling, whom she first met at U. C. Berkeley from 1958 to 1959. Afterwards, Sontag was the partner of María Irene Fornés, a Cuban-American avant garde playwright and director. Upon splitting with Fornés, she was involved with an Italian aristocrat, Carlotta Del Pezzo, and the German academic Eva Kollisch. Sontag was romantically involved with the American artists Jasper Johns and Paul Thek. During the early 1970s, Sontag lived with Nicole Stéphane, a Rothschild banking heiress turned movie actress, and, later, the choreographer Lucinda Childs. She also had a relationship with the writer Joseph Brodsky. With photographer Annie Leibovitz, Sontag maintained a close romantic relationship stretching from the later 1980s until her final years.

Sontag and Leibovitz met in 1989, when both had already established notability in their careers. Leibovitz has suggested that Sontag mentored her and constructively criticized her work. During Sontag's lifetime, neither woman publicly disclosed whether the relationship was a friendship or romantic in nature. Newsweek in 2006 made reference to Leibovitz's decade-plus relationship with Sontag, stating, "The two first met in the late '80s, when Leibovitz photographed her for a book jacket. They never lived together, though they each had an apartment within view of the other's."

Leibovitz, when interviewed for her 2006 book A Photographer's Life: 1990–2005, said the book told a number of stories, and that "with Susan, it was a love story." While The New York Times in 2009 referred to Sontag as Leibovitz's "companion", Leibovitz wrote in A Photographer's Life that, "Words like 'companion' and 'partner' were not in our vocabulary. We were two people who helped each other through our lives. The closest word is still 'friend. That same year, Leibovitz said the descriptor "lover" was accurate. She later reiterated, "Call us 'lovers.' I like 'lovers.' You know, 'lovers' sounds romantic. I mean, I want to be perfectly clear. I love Susan."

In an interview in The Guardian in 2000, Sontag was quite open about bisexuality:

Many of Sontag's obituaries failed to mention her significant same-sex relationships, most notably that with Annie Leibovitz. Daniel Okrent, public editor of The New York Times defended the newspaper's obituary, stating that at the time of Sontag's death, a reporter could make no independent verification of her romantic relationship with Leibovitz (despite attempts to do so). After Sontag's death, Newsweek published an article about Annie Leibovitz that made clear references to her decade-plus relationship with Sontag.

Sontag was quoted by Editor-in-Chief Brendan Lemon of Out magazine as saying "I grew up in a time when the modus operandi was the 'open secret.' I'm used to that, and quite OK with it. Intellectually, I know why I haven't spoken more about my sexuality, but I do wonder if I haven't repressed something there to my detriment. Maybe I could have given comfort to some people if I had dealt with the subject of my private sexuality more, but it's never been my prime mission to give comfort, unless somebody's in drastic need. I'd rather give pleasure, or shake things up."

Legacy
Following Sontag's death, Steve Wasserman of the Los Angeles Times called her "one of America's most influential intellectuals, internationally renowned for the passionate engagement and breadth of her critical intelligence and her ardent activism in the cause of human rights." Eric Homberger of The Guardian called Sontag "the 'Dark Lady' of American cultural life for over four decades." He observed that "despite a brimming and tartly phrased political sensibility, she was fundamentally an aesthete [who] offered a reorientation of American cultural horizons."

Writing about Against Interpretation (1966), Brandon Robshaw of The Independent later observed that "Sontag was remarkably prescient; her project of analysing popular culture as well as high culture, the Doors as well as Dostoevsky, is now common practice throughout the educated world." In Critique and Postcritique (2017), Rita Felski and Elizabeth S. Anker argue that the title essay from the aforementioned collection played an important role in the field of postcritique, a movement within literary criticism and cultural studies that attempts to find new forms of reading and interpretation that go beyond the methods of critique, critical theory, and ideological criticism.

Reviewing Sontag's On Photography (1977) in 1998, Michael Starenko wrote that the work "has become so deeply absorbed into this discourse that Sontag's claims about photography, as well as her mode of argument, have become part of the rhetorical 'tool kit' that photography theorists and critics carry around in their heads."

Criticism

White civilization as a cancer
Sontag drew criticism for writing in 1967 in Partisan Review:

According to journalist Mark M. Goldblatt, Sontag later made a "sarcastic retraction, saying the line slanders cancer patients." According to Eliot Weinberger, "She came to regret that last phrase, and wrote a whole book against the use of illness as metaphor." However, he writes, this did not lead to any "public curiosity about those who are not cancerously white." "She may well have been the last unashamed Eurocentrist."

Allegations of plagiarism
Ellen Lee accused Sontag of plagiarism when Lee discovered at least twelve passages in In America (1999) that were similar to, or copied from, passages in four other books about Helena Modjeska without attribution. Sontag said about using the passages, "All of us who deal with real characters in history transcribe and adopt original sources in the original domain. I've used these sources and I've completely transformed them. There's a larger argument to be made that all of literature is a series of references and allusions."

In a 2007 letter to the editor of the Times Literary Supplement, John Lavagnino identified an unattributed citation from Roland Barthes' 1970 essay "S/Z" in Sontag's 2004 speech "At the Same Time: The Novelist and Moral Reasoning", delivered as the Nadine Gordimer Lecture in March 2004. Further research led Lavagnino to identify several passages which appeared to have been taken without attribution from an essay on hypertext fiction by Laura Miller, originally published in the New York Times Book Review six years earlier. Writing for the Observer, Michael Calderone interviewed Sontag's publisher about the allegations, who argued, "This was a speech, not a formal essay", and that "Susan herself never prepared it for publication."

On Communism
At a New York pro-Solidarity rally in 1982, Sontag stated that "people on the left", like herself, "have willingly or unwillingly told a lot of lies." She added that they:

Sontag's speech reportedly "drew boos and shouts from the audience". The Nation published her speech, excluding the passage contrasting the magazine with Reader's Digest. Responses to her statement were varied. Some said that Sontag's current sentiments had been, in fact, held by many on the left for years, while others accused her of betraying "radical ideas".

On the September 11 attacks
Sontag received angry criticism for her remarks in The New Yorker (September 24, 2001) about the immediate aftermath of 9/11. In her commentary, she referred to the attacks as a "monstrous dose of reality" and criticized U.S. public officials and media commentators for trying to convince the American public that "everything is O.K." Specifically, she opposed the idea that the perpetrators were "cowards", a comment George W. Bush made among other remarks on September 11. Rather, she argued the country should see the terrorists' actions not as "a 'cowardly' attack on 'civilization' or 'liberty' or 'humanity' or 'the free world' but an attack on the world's self-proclaimed superpower, undertaken as a consequence of specific American alliances and actions."

Criticisms from other writers
Tom Wolfe dismissed Sontag as "just another scribbler who spent her life signing up for protest meetings and lumbering to the podium encumbered by her prose style, which had a handicapped parking sticker valid at Partisan Review."

In "Sontag, Bloody Sontag", an essay in her 1994 book Vamps & Tramps, critic Camille Paglia describes her initial admiration and subsequent disillusionment. She mentions several criticisms of Sontag, including Harold Bloom's comment of "Mere Sontagisme!" on Paglia's doctoral dissertation, and states that Sontag "had become synonymous with a shallow kind of hip posturing." Paglia also tells of a visit by Sontag to Bennington College, in which she arrived hours late and ignored the agreed-upon topic of the event.

Nassim Nicholas Taleb in his book Skin in the Game criticizes Sontag and other people with extravagant lifestyles who nevertheless declare themselves "against the market system". Taleb assesses Sontag's shared New York mansion at $28 million, and states that "it is immoral to be in opposition to the market system and not live (somewhere in Vermont or Northwestern Afghanistan) in a hut or cave isolated from it." Taleb also argues that it is even more immoral to "claim virtue without fully living with its direct consequences."

Works

Fiction
 (1963) The Benefactor 
 (1967) Death Kit 
 (1977) I, etcetera (Collection of short stories) 
 (1991) The Way We Live Now (short story) 
 (1992) The Volcano Lover 
 (1999) In America  – winner of the 2000 U.S. National Book Award for Fiction

Plays
 A Parsifal (1991), a deconstruction inspired by Robert Wilson's 1991 staging of the Wagner opera
 Alice in Bed (1993), about 19th century intellectual Alice James, who was confined to bed by illness
 Lady from the Sea, an adaptation of Henrik Ibsen's 1888 play of the same name, premiered in 1998 in Italy. Sontag wrote an essay about it in 1999 in Theatre called "Rewriting Lady from the Sea".

Nonfiction

Collections of essays
 (1966) Against Interpretation  (includes Notes on "Camp")
 (1969) Styles of Radical Will 
 (1977) On Photography 
 (1980) Under the Sign of Saturn 
 (2001) Where the Stress Falls 
 (2007) At the Same Time: Essays & Speeches  (edited by Paolo Dilonardo and Anne Jump, with a foreword by David Rieff)

Sontag also published nonfiction essays in The New Yorker, The New York Review of Books, Times Literary Supplement, The Nation, Granta, Partisan Review and the London Review of Books.

Monographs
 (1959) Freud: The Mind of the Moralist
 (1978) Illness as Metaphor 
 (1988) AIDS and Its Metaphors (a continuation of Illness as Metaphor) 
 (2003) Regarding the Pain of Others

Films
 (1969) Duett för kannibaler (Duet for Cannibals)
 (1971) Broder Carl (Brother Carl)
 (1974) Promised Lands
 (1983) Unguided Tour AKA Letter from Venice

Other works
 (2002) Liner notes for the Patti Smith album Land
 (2004) Contribution of phrases to Fischerspooner's third album Odyssey
 (2008) Reborn: Journals and Notebooks 1947–1963
 (2012) As Consciousness Is Harnessed to Flesh: Journals and Notebooks, 1964–1980.

Awards and honors
 1976: Arts and Letters Award in Literature 
 1977: National Book Critics Circle Award for On Photography
 1979: Beca member of the American Arts 
 1990: MacArthur Fellowship
 1992: Malaparte Prize, Italy
 1999: Commandeur des Arts et des Lettres, France
 2000: National Book Award for In America
 2001: Jerusalem Prize, awarded every two years to a writer whose work explores the freedom of the individual in society.
 2002: George Polk Award, for Cultural Criticism for "Looking at War", in The New Yorker
 2003: Honorary Doctorate of Tübingen University
 2003: Friedenspreis des Deutschen Buchhandels during the Frankfurt Book Fair
 2003: Prince of Asturias Award on Literature.
 2004: Two days after her death, Muhidin Hamamdzic, the mayor of Sarajevo announced the city would name a street after her, calling her an "author and a humanist who actively participated in the creation of the history of Sarajevo and Bosnia." Theatre Square outside the National Theatre was promptly proposed to be renamed Susan Sontag Theatre Square. It took five years, however, for that tribute to become official. On January 13, 2010, the city of Sarajevo posted a plate with a new street name for Theater Square: Theater Square of Susan Sontag.

Digital archive
A digital archive of 17,198 of Sontag's emails is kept by the UCLA Department of Special Collections at the Charles E. Young Research Library. Her archive—and the efforts to make it publicly available while protecting it from bit rot—are the subject of the article On Excess: Susan Sontag's Born-Digital Archive, by Jeremy Schmidt and Jacquelyn Ardam.

Documentary and biopic film 
A documentary about Sontag directed by Nancy Kates, titled Regarding Susan Sontag, was released in 2014. It received the Special Jury Mention for Best Documentary Feature at the 2014 Tribeca Film Festival.

In February 2023, it was announced that a biographical film by Kirsten Johnson and featuring Kristen Stewart as Sontag was in development. It is based on the biography Sontag: Her Life and Work by Benjamin Moser.

See also
 LGBT culture in New York City
 List of LGBT people from New York City

Notes

References
 Poague, Leland (ed.) Conversations with Susan Sontag, University of Mississippi Press, 1995 
 Rollyson, Carl and Lisa Paddock, Susan Sontag: The Making of an Icon, W. W. Norton, 2000
 
 Weingrad, Michael. The Sorry Significance of Susan Sontag, online 'Mosaic,' November 12, 2019; (a review of B. Moser's book 'Sontag').

Further reading
 Susan Sontag: The Elegiac Modernist by Sohnya Sayres,  (1990)
 Susan Sontag: The Making of an Icon by Carl Rollyson and Lisa Paddock,  (2000)
 Sontag and Kael by Craig Seligman,  (2004)
 The Din in the Head by Cynthia Ozick,  (2006; Sontag is discussed in the foreword, "On Discord and Desire")
 Swimming in a Sea of Death: A Son's Memoir by David Rieff,  (2008)
 Notes on Sontag by Phillip Lopate,  (2009)
 Susan Sontag: A Biography by Daniel Schreiber (trans. David Dollenmayer), Northwestern  (2014)
 Sempre Susan: A Memoir of Susan Sontag by Sigrid Nunez,  (2014)
 Tough Enough: Arbus, Arendt, Didion, McCarthy, Sontag, Weil by Deborah Nelson,  (2017)
 Susan Sontag und Thomas Mann by Kai Sina,  (2017)
 Sontag: Her Life and Work by Benjamin Moser, HarperCollins,  (2019)

External links

 
 
 "with Ramona Koval", Books and Writing, ABC Radio National, January 30, 2005
 Susan Sontag and Richard Howard from "The Writer, The Work", a series sponsored by PEN and curated by Susan Sontag
 Susan Sontag wrote an essay: On American Language and Culture from PEN American Center
 The Politics of Translation: Discussion, with panel members Susan Sontag, Esther Allen, Ammiel Alcalay, Michael Hofmann & Steve Wasserman, PEN American Center
 Susan Sontag – Photos by Mathieu Bourgois.
 The Friedenspreis acceptance speech (2003-10-12)
 Fascinating Fascism illustrated text of Sontag's foundational 1974 article on Nazi filmmaker Leni Riefenstahl's aesthetics, from Under the Sign of Saturn
 Sontag's comments in The New Yorker, September 24, 2001 about the September 11 attack on the United States
 Terry Castle, Desperately Seeking Susan, London Review of Books, March 2005 
 Sheelah Kolhatkar, "Notes on camp Sontag" New York Observer, January 8, 2005
 
 'Susan Sontag: The Collector,' by Daniel Mendelsohn, The New Republic
 
 In Depth interview with Sontag, March 2, 2003
 

1933 births
2004 deaths
Deaths from myelodysplastic syndrome
American anti-communists
American feminist writers
American film critics
American literary critics
American women literary critics
American historical novelists
American women novelists
Bisexual women
Continental philosophers
Jewish anti-communists
Jewish American writers
Jewish women writers
Jewish philosophers
American LGBT novelists
Photography critics
American women film critics
Women historical novelists
MacArthur Fellows
National Book Award winners
Jerusalem Prize recipients
Bisexual feminists
Jewish feminists
LGBT Jews
American anti–Vietnam War activists
Alumni of St Anne's College, Oxford
Harvard University alumni
Sarah Lawrence College faculty
University of California, Berkeley alumni
University of Chicago alumni
University of Paris alumni
American expatriates in France
American people of Lithuanian-Jewish descent
American people of Polish-Jewish descent
LGBT people from New York (state)
LGBT people from Arizona
Liberalism in the United States
Writers from Tucson, Arizona
Novelists from Arizona
Writers from New York City
Deaths from cancer in New York (state)
Deaths from leukemia
Burials at Montparnasse Cemetery
20th-century American essayists
21st-century American essayists
20th-century American historians
21st-century American historians
20th-century American novelists
21st-century American novelists
20th-century American women writers
21st-century American women writers
Novelists from New York (state)
American women historians
Bisexual academics
People involved in plagiarism controversies
North Hollywood High School alumni
Historians from New York (state)
LGBT philosophers
American women critics
Members of the American Academy of Arts and Letters
American bisexual writers